Rawwest Nigga Alive (edited version titled Rawwest Alive) is a mixtape by American rapper Tyga. It was released on January 16, 2016, by his independently owned record label Last Kings Records. The mixtape features guest appearances from Chris Brown, Nas, T.I. and Goapele. Preceding the mixtape's release were three singles: "Dope'd Up", "Happy Birthday", and "Baller Alert" featuring Rick Ross and 2 Chainz.

The project was later renamed Rawwest Alive and released on iTunes on January 16, 2016. On January 19, 2016, Tyga released the music video for "I $mile, I Cry".. On March 22, 2016, Tyga released the music video for "$ervin Dat Raww" crediting Maria Skobeleva as director.

Track listing 
All songs are produced by CrakWav, with the exception of "Rumorz", which was co-produced by Jess Jackson.

Notes
 "10 Million $ Mortgage" is not available on streaming services.

Sample credits
"Rumorz" samples "Rumors by Timex Social Club
"$ervin Dat Raww" samples "Think (About It) by Lyn Collins and "It's All About The Benjamins by Puff Daddy featuring Lil Kim, The LOX and The Notorious B.I.G.
"Everybody Eat$" samples "Everybody Eats from Paid in Full

References

Tyga albums
2016 mixtape albums
Empire Distribution albums